Mike and Angelo is a British sci-fi TV sitcom series, that ran on CITV between 16 March 1989 and 7 March 2000. The show is ITV's second longest running sitcom (as per series count).

Plot
The shows initially centred on Mike King (played by Matt Wright), and his mother Rita moving to London from the United States after she divorces Mike's father. In their new house, and feeling lonely in his new surroundings, Mike discovers a mysterious wardrobe. It bursts open containing Angelo (Tyler Butterworth), an alien who came from another world; the portal being the wardrobe. Angelo has no knowledge of life on Earth or of his own - so relies on the help of Mike to understand the world he has crashed on. At the same time, Mike is in turn helped by Angelo to integrate into life in London.

Together, Mike and Angelo have many crazy adventures, all within the vicinity of the house that they live in. Angelo is always inventing something crazy, or walking on the ceiling (due to him being an alien), and generally misunderstanding various aspects of human behaviour and daily life which leads to various escapades and situations.

The series frequently featured guest actors in various roles. Some actors which appeared in the show include: Ron Moody, John Savident, Christopher Ryan, Brian Murphy and Anthony O'Donnell.

History

Development
The title of the series is a play on the name of the painter Michelangelo. In the early planning stages of the series, creators Grant Cathro and Lee Pressman had toyed with the idea of making Angelo somehow a guardian angel towards Mike. They were inspired by Michelangelo's The Creation of Adam. Although the idea of the guardian angel was ultimately unutilised in the series, they liked the name-play and stuck with it.

Writers Lee Pressman and Grant Cathro set Mike & Angelo in Cricklewood, London - which would also later be the setting of their later series Spatz.

Thames Television era (series 1-4)

The tone of the first two series was more comedy-drama (early episodes were even billed as a drama.) Several episodes of the first series focussed on the loneliness Mike was feeling after moving to a different country which was helped by his new friendship with Angelo. The original two series featured a quirky, whimsical flute-led theme tune on the opening and closing credits, written by Jim Parker.

The first changes to the show would occur with repeats of the first two series in 1990. The original theme tune was replaced by the version which would later be used from Series 3 onwards, written by David Stafford, as well as a new opening credits narration (read by Matt Zimmerman), also used from Series 3, was also added to these repeated episodes. Additionally, a laugh track was added, which would until the end of the show's run, was also dubbed on, where it had not originally been present. These changes to the originally shown versions were in part to make the series more 'uniform', as Children's ITV had hoped to sell the series to stations in America; a plan which never fully came to fruition.

Series 3 would feature the first of the show's many cast changes, with Tim Whitnall replacing Tyler Butterworth as Angelo. In the first episode of the series, Angelo falls ill and eventually "regenerates" (borrowing a concept first used in Doctor Who). Tim Whitnall would remain as the character for the rest of the programme's run. At around this point, the comedy drama tone of the first two series began to be shifted towards the more fantastical and farcical, with Angelo creating many inventions which typically run out of control, and occasionally summoning up historical figures from the past.

Mike King moves back to the US at the beginning of Series 4 to be with his dad, with Ellie, a young neighbour, filling the gap left by the character for the rest of Series 4, befriending Angelo and getting caught up with his various gadgets and escapades.

Tetra Films era (series 5-12)

Mike and Angelo was recommissioned in 1992 by Carlton Television for a fifth series, after Thames Television lost its ITV franchise. Series 5 would be produced by Tetra Films, and featured a new theme composed by Kim Goody and Alan Coates, which would remain, in several slight variations, for the remainder of the show's run. Rita's nephew Mike Mason (Michael Benz) is introduced - as well being in keeping with the title of the series (despite the character of Ellie in Series 4), Benz would become the longest-running "Mike" character, featuring in 6 of the 12 series.

By the start of Series 7, Rita has decided to return to the USA. Her place was filled by new character Katy Andrews (Katy Murphy), a new housekeeper.

Series 11 saw the exit of Michael Benz, and the series began with Angelo and Katy reading a postcard explaining that Mike was having a good time in America after returning there. In his place, recurring neighbour character Daphne Fawkes-Bentley's niece Mickey (Gemma Gregory) became Angelo's sidekick.

For the final series, Katy's nephew - also called Mike (Steven Geller), joined. Geller later passed away in 2015 aged 30.

Although the series never came to an official conclusion, it was not renewed after Series 12 (2000) due to it being felt that the series had run its course, and because of a shift in Children's ITV's audience demographic.

Cast and characters

Main

Angelo - Tyler Butterworth (1989–1990) & Tim Whitnall (1990–2000): Angelo is a goofy but kind-hearted alien from the planet of Ptarg. He has the ability to make crazy inventions for his friends and among other things, is able to walk on the ceiling.
Mike King - Matt Wright (1989–1991):  The original Mike, American teenager Mike King discovers Angelo and helps him accustom to life on Earth - all while ensuring no-one finds out his secret.
Rita King - Shelley Thompson (1989–1994): Rita is the  owner of the house and Mike's mother. She is aware of Angelo and helps her son keep him a secret from visitors to the house.
Mike Mason - Michael Benz (1993–1998):  The second and longest-appearing Mike, Mike Mason is the nephew of Rita.
Katy Andrews - Katy Murphy (1995–2000): The quick-tempered but good-natured Scottish housekeeper, who takes over looking after the house in addition to seeking work as an actress. She lands a big Hollywood role at the end of her first season, but returns to her housekeeping job soon afterwards.
Michaela "Mickey" Fawkes-Bentley - Gemma Gregory (1999): The niece of posh neighbour Daphne, Mickey is more fun-loving than her aunt.
Mike - Steven Geller (2000): The final Mike and Katy's nephew, he is snarky and intended to act as a Straight man to Angelo. How he came to be staying with them was never explained.

Supporting
Cyril Pinner - John Levitt (1989–1994): A nosey neighbour, Mr Pinner is suspicious of the events happening next door.
Philippa Fraser - Alessia Gwyther (1989–1991): A young snooty neighbour who attempts to befriend Mike King.
Brett Douglas - Gavin Richards (1989–1993): Rita's friend who is suspicious of Angelo.
Nancy Mancini (Rita King's mother) - Libby Morris (1989–1991): Sassy and a gossip, she stays occasionally in the house.
Tony King (Rita King's former husband) - Jeff Harding (1989–1991): Father of Mike King who has a strained relationship with Rita (although it is possible that they mend and continue their relationship after Rita's departure).
Ellie - Jade Magri (1991): Neighbourhood girl who helps Angelo in Series 4.
Melanie Pinner - Alexandra Milman (1993–1994): Mike Mason's girlfriend in Series 5 and 6, niece of Mr Pinner.
Uncle Bob -  Ron Berglas (1995): Uncle of Mike Mason who checks in on Mike, Angelo and Katy regularly in Series 7.
Sam - Katie Pearson (1995): Mike Mason's girlfriend in Series 7.
Daphne Fawkes-Bentley - Elizabeth Estensen (1995–2000): The stuck-up neighbour and aunt of Mickey. Played by Elizabeth Estensen, who portrayed the first T-Bag in fellow Pressman and Cathro show T-Bag. As a result, much of Daphne's character is in reference to the character of T-Bag.
Zoe - Candace Hallinan (1998): Mike Mason's rather snarky girlfriend in Series 9 and 10.

Transmissions

Old Skool Weekend
In 2013, two episodes of Mike & Angelo were repeated on CITV as part of its 30th anniversary Old Skool Weekend:

 The first, shown on 5 January 2013, entitled "Fuzzball", had originally been broadcast on CITV on 26 October 1989
 The second, shown on 6 January 2013, was titled "Heirs And Graces", and had originally been broadcast on CITV on 7 March 1996.

References

External links

Glad You Remember - Mike and Angelo - Fansite featuring an Episode Guide and Interviews.

Mike and Angelo at BFI

1989 British television series debuts
2000 British television series endings
1980s British children's television series
1990s British children's television series
2000s British children's television series
ITV children's television shows
Television duos
Television series by Fremantle (company)
1980s British teen sitcoms
1990s British teen sitcoms
2000s British teen sitcoms
British science fiction television shows
Television series by FremantleMedia Kids & Family
Television shows produced by Thames Television
Carlton Television
English-language television shows
1980s British science fiction television series
1990s British science fiction television series
2000s British science fiction television series